Mama Melrose's Ristorante Italiano is an Italian restaurant in the Grand Avenue area at Disney's Hollywood Studios. Located near Muppet*Vision 3D and Star Tours, the restaurant specializes in Italian cuisine, serving such dishes as ossobuco, wood-fired flatbread pizza, and grilled salmon and sausage grinders. A Fantasmic! dinner package is available that grants restaurant guests quicker access to this show. This package is also offered at two other restaurants in the park: the Hollywood Brown Derby and Hollywood & Vine. Ron Douglas included the recipe for Mama Melrose's cappuccino crème brûlée in his cookbook America's Most Wanted Recipes: Just Desserts.

Mama Melrose's is decorated with film memorabilia and Italian bric-à-brac. The restaurant's background music consists of songs sung by such Italian-American singers as Tony Bennett and Frank Sinatra.

Italian-American Restaurant Music

California Dreamin’ - Mama’s and Papas 

Walk of Life -  Dire Straits

It Never Rains in Southern California - Albert Hammond

That’s Amore - Dean Martin

Bella Notte - Instrumental

References

Bibliography

Streets of America
Walt Disney World restaurants
Italian restaurants in the United States
Disney's Hollywood Studios
Grand Avenue (Disney)
Restaurants established in 1991